Aki Juusela (born June 28, 1991) is a Finnish professional ice hockey left winger.

Juusela previously played in Liiga for Ässät and made his debut for the team during the 2011–12 season. After two seasons, he moved to Lempäälän Kisa of Mestis on August 1, 2013. After a failed try-out with Västerviks IK, Juusela was further down a division, signing for HC Satakunta of the Suomi-sarja before returning to Mestis with KooKoo.

On August 17, 2015, Juusela signed for TUTO Hockey. He stayed for three seasons before returning to Ässät on April 30, 2018. On May 30, 2019, Juusela moved to Slovakia to sign for HK Dukla Michalovce of the Tipsport Liga.

References

External links

 

1991 births
Living people
Ässät players
HK Dukla Michalovce players
Ferencvárosi TC (ice hockey) players
Finnish ice hockey left wingers
KooKoo players
Lempäälän Kisa players
People from Rauma, Finland
TuTo players
Finnish expatriate ice hockey players in Hungary
Finnish expatriate ice hockey players in Slovakia
Sportspeople from Satakunta